Nyhetskanalen was a Norwegian news channel started by A-Pressen. The channel was first broadcast on 18 August 1997 and ceased operations on 30 January 1998.  It was only available in and around Oslo.

References
TV-satsing til 100 mill
Nyhetskanalen i Oslo er lagt ned

Defunct television channels in Norway
Television channels and stations established in 1997
Television channels and stations disestablished in 1998
1997 establishments in Norway
1998 disestablishments in Norway